The New Eastern Villages (NEV) is a development in the Borough of Swindon, to the east of the town of Swindon, England. 

The land allocated for the development lies east of the A419 primary route. The greater part of its area lies south of the A420, another primary route between Swindon and Oxford; the part to the north of the A420 includes an expansion of South Marston village, and a new area to be known as Rowborough. 

It is the largest strategic allocation within the adopted Swindon Borough Local Plan 2026.  It will comprise 8,000 new homes, 40 hectares for employment, transport improvements, a new secondary school and primary schools, together with retail, health, community and leisure facilities, including a new district centre. Developers on the project include Capital Land Property Group.

The development area falls within South Marston, Wanborough and Bishopstone civil parishes. Rural buffers will be retained to preserve the separate identity of the chief settlements of those parishes.

An express bus route will link part of the area to Swindon town centre, and a park-and-ride site with 1,000 spaces will be provided. The abandoned Wilts & Berks Canal crossed the area from south to north-east on its way to join the Thames near Abingdon, and the line of the canal is protected to allow for its potential future reinstatement.

References 

Borough of Swindon
Populated places in Wiltshire